Fatehgarh is a village in the Bhiwani district of the Indian state of Haryana. , the village had 655 households with a total population of 3,226 of which 1,707 were male and 1,519 female.

References

Villages in Charkhi Dadri district